Guernica / A Magazine of Art and Politics is an online magazine that publishes art, photography, fiction, and poetry from around the world, along with nonfiction such as letters from abroad, investigative pieces, and opinion pieces on international affairs and U.S. domestic policy. It also publishes interviews and profiles of artists, writers, musicians, and political figures.

Guernica Inc. has been a not-for-profit corporation since 2009.Guernica'''s stated mission is to publish works that explore "the crossroads between art and politics".

According to Publishers Weekly, Guernica was founded in 2004 by Joel Whitney, Michael Archer, Josh Jones, and Elizabeth Onusko. National Book Foundation Director Lisa Lucas was the publisher of Guernica from June 2014 until February 2016. Lisa Factora-Borchers and Madhuri Sastry are the current Publishers, and Jina Moore is the current Editor-in-Chief.

Awards and events

In 2008, Okey Ndibe's "My Biafran Eyes" won a Best of the Web prize, Dzanc Books.

In 2008, Rebecca Morgan Frank's "Rescue" was chosen for the Best New Poets award.

In 2009, Esquire magazine cited Guernica for its fiction and called it a "great online literary magazine".

In 2009, Matthew Derby's short story for Guernica, "January in December", won a Best of the Web prize (Dzanc Books).

In 2009, E. C. Osondu was awarded the Caine Prize for African Writing for his Guernica short story, "Waiting."

In 2010, Mark Dowie's "Food Among the Ruins" was chosen for the Best of the Net anthology.

In 2010, Oliver de la Paz's poem "Requiem for the Orchard", F. Daniel Rzicnek's poem "Geomancy" and Elizabeth Crane's short story "The Genius Meetings" won Best of the Web prizes, Dzanc Books.

In 2011, Bridget Potter's essay "Lucky Girl" was chosen for The Best American Essays, 2011, guest-edited by Edwidge Danticat.

In 2011, Jack Shenker's "Dam Dilemma" was part of a portfolio of his work longlisted for the Orwell Prize for Political Writing in the UK.

In 2013, Guernica won Utne Magazine's Media Award for Best Social/Cultural Coverage.

In 2016, Alexander Chee's essay "Girl" was chosen for The Best American Essays, 2016, edited by Jonathan Franzen.

Guernica won the 2016 AWP Small Press Publisher Award given by the Association of Writers & Writing Programs that "acknowledges the hard work, creativity, and innovation" of small presses and "their contributions to the literary landscape" of the US.

In 2017, won the PEN American Center Nora Magid Award for Editing.

Aleš Šteger's poem "Earring" (translated by Brian Henry) was selected for the Best of the Net Anthology (Sundress Publications).Guernica'' is a five-time PEN World Voices participant in 2008, 2009, 2010, 2012, and 2013. With PEN American Center, Guernica fiction editors produce a flash fiction series that is run on both its own site and on PEN's. It has co-sponsored events with the Asian American Writers' Workshop, Amnesty International and various publishing companies.

Contributors and editors
Contributors include Lorraine Adams, Chimamanda Ngozi Adichie, Jesse Ball, A. Igoni Barrett, Karen E. Bender, Amit Chaudhuri, Susan Choi, Noam Chomsky, Billy Collins, Susan Daitch, Marguerite Duras, Stephen Elliott, Rivka Galchen, James Galvin, Amitav Ghosh, Mahvish Khan, Alexandra Kleeman, Eric Kraft, Kiese Laymon, Douglas Light, Sarah Lindsay, Dorthe Nors, Okey Ndibe, Meghan O'Rourke, Zachary Mason, Tracy O'Neill, Daniele Pantano, Matthew Rohrer, Deb Olin Unferth, Sergio Ramírez,  Amartya Sen, Aurelie Sheehan, Jonathan Steele, Laren Stover, Terese Svoboda, Mitch Swenson, Olufemi Terry, Anthony Tognazzini, Frederic Tuten, Joe Wenderoth Patrick White, and Yaa Gyasi.

Recent guest fiction and poetry editors have included: Alexander Chee, Pia Ehrhardt, Roxane Gay, Francisco Goldman, Randa Jarrar, Sam Lipsyte, Ben Marcus, Claire Messud, George Saunders, Tracy K. Smith, and Frederic Tuten.

Interview subjects have included: filmmaker John Waters, Congressman John Conyers, Congresswomen Marcy Kaptur and Carolyn B. Maloney, Costa Rican President Óscar Arias, Justice Department legal counsel John Yoo, former member of Dutch Parliament Ayaan Hirsi Ali, former Iraqi cabinet member Ali Allawi, artist Chuck Close, singers Lila Downs and David Byrne, and authors Etgar Keret, Andrew Bacevich, Don DeLillo, Howard Zinn, Samantha Power, Joseph Spece, Bernard-Henri Lévy, Nicholas D. Kristof, Joan Didion, playwright Tony Kushner, and actor Mia Farrow.

The magazine's advisory board includes: Richard Howard, Norman Solomon, Frederic Tuten

Senior editors include: Adam Dalva (senior editor, fiction), Kamelya Omaya Youssef (senior editor, poetry), and Eryn Loeb (deputy editor).

See also 
List of literary magazines

References

External links
 Guernica magazine current issue
 Publishers Weekly, "Guernica: Lit Mag Beats the Odds"
 The Guardian, "EC Osondu takes £10,000 'African Booker'"

Online literary magazines published in the United States
Biweekly magazines published in the United States
Magazines established in 2004
Magazines published in New York City
Modern liberal magazines published in the United States